The Highlands is a mountain in Barnstable County, Massachusetts. Green Hill is located southeast of The Highlands.

References

Mountains of Massachusetts
Mountains of Barnstable County, Massachusetts